William Baldwin (31 January 1907 – 1982) was an English professional footballer. His clubs included Chesterfield, Oldham Athletic and Gillingham. He made 95 Football League appearances.

References

1907 births
1982 deaths
Footballers from Leigh, Greater Manchester
Association football forwards
English footballers
Gillingham F.C. players
Chesterfield F.C. players
Oldham Athletic A.F.C. players
Southport F.C. players
Barrow A.F.C. players
Crewe Alexandra F.C. players
Scunthorpe United F.C. players
English Football League players